Kostal UK Ltd v Dunkley [2021] UKSC 47 is a UK labour law case, concerning the right to suffer no detriment for joining, or inducements to not join, a trade union.

Facts
Dunkley and others claimed their right to not be induced to leave a collective agreement was violated by their employer. Kostal UK Ltd wrote to employees, re-stating a pay offer the union had rejected and if it was not accepted by 18 December, no Christmas bonus would be paid (as was in the offer). In January 2016, it wrote to the employees saying non-acceptance could lead to dismissal. Employees claimed this was an unlawful inducement under TULRCA 1992 section 145B with a "prohibited result" that the workers' terms of employment "will not (or will no longer) be determined by collective agreement".

The Tribunal found the employers' conduct was unlawful. This Court of Appeal reversed this, Singh LJ finding in employers’ favour. The employees appealed.

Judgment
The Supreme Court held that an offer by employers to workers violated TULRCA 1992 section 145B if workers terms would not be set by collective agreement, or there was a real possibility. This should be assumed where there was an agreed collective bargaining procedure that was not complied with.

Lord Leggatt said the following:

Lord Burrows and Lady Arden said the following.

Lady Arden and Lord Burrows, [126]-[129] would have gone further: an employer breached s 145B where (i) an offer, if accepted, would constitute contracting out of collective bargaining on that occasion so that the offer satisfied the "prohibited result" requirement; and (ii) the employer's main purpose was to achieve that result rather than having a genuine business purpose. On that interpretation, it did not necessarily follow that the employer escaped liability just because the collective bargaining process had been exhausted.

See also
UK labour law

Notes

References

United Kingdom labour case law